The canton of Liévin-Nord  is a former canton situated in the department of the Pas-de-Calais and in the Nord-Pas-de-Calais region of northern France. It was disbanded following the French canton reorganisation which came into effect in March 2015. It had a total of 21,045 inhabitants (2012).

Geography 
The canton is organised around Liévin in the arrondissement of Lens. The altitude varies from 32m (Liévin) to 80m (Grenay) for an average altitude of 57m.

The canton comprised 2 communes:
Grenay
Liévin (partly)

See also 
Cantons of Pas-de-Calais 
Communes of Pas-de-Calais 
Arrondissements of the Pas-de-Calais department

References

Former cantons of Pas-de-Calais
2015 disestablishments in France
States and territories disestablished in 2015